Lucy Turmel (born 24 September 1999 in Ipswich) is an English professional squash player. As of April 2019, her world rank was No. 52.

Career
In 2022, she won a bronze at the 2022 Women's World Team Squash Championships.

References

1999 births
Living people
English female squash players